There are about 30 species of amphibians in Singapore. Amphibians are aquatic vertebrates. They need water to survive. They include frogs, toads, newts, salamanders and caecilians. But Singapore does not have newts and salamanders.

The most common amphibians one is likely to encounter are the Asian toad and banded bullfrog. Some species are common in forested areas, like the black-eyed litter frog.

List of amphibians

Order Anura (frogs and toads)

Family Bufonidae (toads)
Asian toad (Duttaphrynus melanostictus) - Common - Singapore Island, Sentosa, Pulau Semakau, Pulau Ubin, Pulau Tekong
Four-ridged toad (Ingerophrynus quadriporcatus) - Common - Central Catchment Nature Reserve, Western Catchment, Pulau Tekong
Saint Andrew's Cross toadlet (Pelophryne ingeri) - Rare - Bukit Timah Nature Reserve

Family Megophryidae (litter frogs)
Black-eyed litter frog (Leptobrachium nigrops) - Common - Bukit Timah Nature Reserve, Central Catchment Nature Reserve
Malayan horned frog (Megophrys nasuta) - Rare - Bukit Timah Nature Reserve, Central Catchment Nature Reserve

Family Dicroglossidae (fanged frogs)
Crab-eating frog (Fejervarya cancrivora) - Common - Singapore Island, Sentosa, Pulau Semakau, Pulau Ubin, Pulau Tekong
Field frog (Fejervarya limnocharis) - Common - Singapore Island, Sentosa, Pulau Semakau, Pulau Ubin, Pulau Tekong
Malayan giant frog (Limnonectes blythii) - Uncommon - Bukit Timah Nature Reserve, Bukit Batok Nature Park, Bukit Gombak, Central Catchment Nature Reserve, Sungei Buloh Wetland Reserve, Western Catchment, Singapore Botanic Gardens
Malesian frog (Limnonectes malesianus) - Uncommon - Bukit Timah Nature Reserve, Central Catchment Nature Reserve, Western Catchment
Masked swamp frog (Limnonectes paramacrodon) - Rare - Central Catchment Nature Reserve, Pulau Tekong
Rhinoceros frog (Limnonectes plicatellus) - Rare - Bukit Timah Nature Reserve, Central Catchment Nature Reserve
Yellow-bellied puddle frog (Occidozyga sumatrana) - Uncommon - Bukit Timah Nature Reserve, Central Catchment Nature Reserve, Western Catchment, Pulau Tekong

Family Ranidae (true frogs)
Copper-cheeked frog (Chalcorana labialis) - Common - Bukit Timah Nature Reserve, Central Catchment Nature Reserve, Western Catchment, Pulau Tekong
Common greenback (Hylarana erythraea) - Common - Singapore Island, Sentosa, Pulau Ubin, Pulau Tekong 
Golden-eared rough-sided frog (Pulchrana baramica) - Uncommon - Central Catchment Nature Reserve, Pulau Tekong 
Masked rough-sided frog (Pulchrana laterimaculata) - Common - Bukit Timah Nature Reserve, Central Catchment Nature Reserve, Holland Woods, Pulau Tekong (unconfirmed)
American bullfrog (Lithobates catesbeianus) - Introduced
Günther's frog (Sylvirana guentheri) - Introduced - Jurong, Kranji, Lim Chu Kang, Sungei Buloh, Yishun, Singapore Botanic Gardens

Family Rhacophoridae (gliding frogs)
Spotted tree frog (Nyctixalus pictus) - Rare - Bukit Timah Nature Reserve, Central Catchment Nature Reserve
Four-lined tree frog (Polypedates leucomystax) - Common - Singapore Island, Sentosa, Pulau Semakau, Pulau Ubin, Pulau Tekong
Blue-spotted tree frog (Leptomantis cyanopunctatus) - Rare - Central Catchment Nature Reserve
Thorny tree frog (Theloderma horridum) - Rare - Bukit Timah Nature Reserve, Central Catchment Nature Reserve

Family Microhylidae (narrow-mouthed frogs)
Lim's black-spotted sticky frog (Kalophrynus limbooliati) - Uncommon - Bukit Timah Nature Reserve, Central Catchment Nature Reserve
Banded bullfrog (Kaloula pulchra) - Introduced - Singapore Island, Sentosa, Pulau Semakau, Pulau Ubin, Pulau Tekong
Painted chorus frog (Microhyla butleri) - Common - Singapore Island, Sentosa, Pulau Ubin, Pulau Tekong
Dark-sided chorus frog (Microhyla heymonsi) - Common - Singapore Island, Sentosa, Pulau Ubin, Pulau Tekong
East Asian ornate chorus frog (Microhyla fissipes) - Introduced - Pulau Tekong, Western Catchment, Lim Chu Kang, Kranji, Bukit Batok, Tampines, Pasir Ris, Lorong Halus, Windsor Nature Park
Manthey's chorus frog (Microhyla mantheyi) - Rare - Central Catchment Nature Reserve
Subaraj's paddy frog (Micryletta subaraji) - Rare - Kranji, Central Catchment Nature Reserve

Family Hylidae (tree frogs)
Australian green tree frog (Ranoidea caerulea) - Escapee - Lim Chu Kang

Family Eleutherodactylidae (rain frogs)
Greenhouse frog (Eleutherodactylus planirostris) - Introduced - Widespread on Singapore Island

Order Gymnophiona (caecilians)

Family Ichthyophiidae (Asian caecilians)
Yellow-banded caecilian (Ichthyophis paucisulcus) - Rare - Bukit Timah Nature Reserve, Central Catchment Nature Reserve
Singapore Black caecilian (Ichthyophis singaporensis) - Status uncertain

See also
List of mammals of Singapore
List of birds of Singapore
List of reptiles of Singapore

References

External links
https://web.archive.org/web/20080411071427/http://www.wildsingapore.per.sg/discovery/Amphibian.htm
http://www.ecologyasia.com/verts/amphibians.htm
http://anura-in-singapore.blogspot.com/
Amphibian and Reptiles of Peninsular Malaysia

Amphibians
Singapore
Singapore